Bottlegate, also referred to as The Beer Bottle Game, was an officiating controversy in an American football game in the 2001 season of the National Football League between the visiting Jacksonville Jaguars and the Cleveland Browns.

The inciting incident occurred in week 14 with the Browns sitting at 6–6, needing a win to keep their playoff hopes alive. Down 15–10 with 1:08 remaining, the Browns were forced to try to convert on 4th and 2 at the Jaguars' 12 yard line. Tim Couch took the snap and passed short to Quincy Morgan, who caught the ball for a 3-yard gain and a first down. Although Morgan appeared to bobble the football, officials called it a complete pass. Couch hurried the offense to the line of scrimmage and spiked the ball with 48 seconds remaining. The officials announced that they would review the 4th down conversion two plays earlier and overturned it, giving the ball to the Jaguars. It sparked controversy because after a play is completed, refs are not allowed to go back and change the call after another play has been run.

Enraged, Browns fans began throwing objects onto the field, mainly plastic beer bottles. Some fans began throwing the stadium's trash cans down to the field as well. After a few minutes, the officials announced that the game would end 48 seconds early and the officials and players exited the field. However, the league office called, telling them to finish the game. The teams and officials came back onto the field and, after two quarterback kneels by the Jaguars, the game was over, 15–10.

Events of the play
The Cleveland Browns were in a position to get an unlikely playoff spot at 6–6, but most likely needed to win their four remaining games of the season to do so. Trailing 15–10 with 1:08 remaining in regulation, the Browns were driving deep into Jaguars territory, looking for a potential go-ahead score. Cleveland was faced with a 4th down and 2 at the Jacksonville 12 yard line. The Browns needed to convert, or else the Jaguars could simply kneel the ball twice and end the game. Quarterback Tim Couch took the snap and passed it short to wide receiver Quincy Morgan, who caught the ball for a 3-yard gain and a first down but appeared to bobble it as he fell to the ground. Despite this, the officials called it a complete pass for a crucial first down with 1:03 remaining. Couch wasted no time hurrying the offense to the line of scrimmage, starting the next play with only 0:50 left on the clock. He took the snap and appeared to pump his arm twice; Couch then spiked the ball with 0:48 remaining to stop the clock.

The officials stopped play and huddled for a lengthy period. CBS announcers Gus Johnson and Brent Jones speculated that they may have been discussing Couch's double-pump before the spike, which, by rule, would constitute intentional grounding. Instead, referee Terry McAulay announced that the replay booth had buzzed his headset for a review of Morgan's fourth-down catch. NFL rules stipulate that a play cannot be reviewed once another play has commenced, but McAulay told the crowd that the review signal had come before the snap on the spike play although audio and video evidence provided by CBS seemed to refute McAulay's claim.

After a booth review, the officials ruled that the fourth-down pass was incomplete, resulting in a turnover on downs to Jacksonville. As the Jaguars celebrated, Browns coach Butch Davis angrily criticized the officials over the timing of the review.

Crowd reaction   
After the controversial decision, many attendees at the stadium, including those in the famous "Dawg Pound" section, became enraged. Some fans began angrily booing and hurling beer bottles (the team's beer sponsor, Miller Brewing Company, had introduced a new plastic bottle which was taken up by the team's concessions provider rather than drinks being poured into lighter plastic cups to reduce waste) and other objects onto the playing field. The players, officials, and coaches migrated to the middle of the field to escape the debris and prevent injury. Some players reported getting hit, but none were seriously injured. A few especially rowdy fans attempted to storm onto the field, but were quickly detained by law enforcement. After a few minutes of waiting for the crowd to settle, the field had become littered with bottles and debris, and referee Terry McAulay made an unsportsmanlike conduct hand signal directed at the crowd, and sternly announced "That is the end of the game!", with 48 seconds left on the clock, something never done before in the history of the NFL. After McAulay's announcement, the players, coaches, and officials began to run off the field. As they sprinted towards the tunnels, the officials and some players and coaches were pelted with bottles. Announcers Johnson and Jones told viewers that they saw an unspecified person fall to the ground after a thrown object, which they claimed was either a Sony Walkman or a CD player, "split his head wide open," and lamented the "ugly" actions of the Cleveland fans.

Game conclusion
After several minutes, NFL Commissioner Paul Tagliabue contacted McAulay and informed him that his officiating crew did not have the authority to end a game early, and that the game must be completed. The officials told the players in the locker room, many of whom were undressed and showering, that they were required to go back out onto the field. By the time all players and officials returned to the field, over 20 minutes had elapsed since the disputed fourth down play. After two kneel-downs by the Jaguars, the game concluded with a final score of 15–10. After the game, McAulay stood by his claim that the booth had buzzed in before the spike play.

Aftermath and legacy
The win did not affect the Jaguars significantly, as they were already eliminated from postseason contention and would finish the 2001 season at 6–10. For the Browns, the loss contributed to the team missing the playoffs.  This loss came in the midst of the Browns losing five of their final six games, to finish the season 7–9. It has been counted as one of the most infamous moments in Browns history, along with The Drive, The Fumble, The Move, and finishing with the second 0–16 record in NFL history in 2017. The Browns eventually made it to the playoffs the following year.

Several fans who took part in the melee were eventually banned from Cleveland home games for 4 years.

Many stadiums, including Cleveland Browns Stadium, also banned the sale of beer in plastic bottles from their venues to prevent a future reoccurrence.  This incident, along with the 2004 Pacers–Pistons brawl, contributed to the sports business industry's now-common policy of limiting alcohol purchases to two drinks per person per concession stand visit, along with alcohol sales ending after the end of the third quarter (or for baseball, the end of the seventh inning). Aluminum beer bottles, which soon replaced the ill-fated plastic bottles as they are easier to recycle and lighter, are now served at venues with the caps removed to reduce their weight if thrown, reduce cap waste, and prevent injury risk.

Bottlegate was later cited as part of a lawsuit filed by New Orleans Saints fans against the NFL referees following another controversial officiating decision during the 2018 NFC Championship Game, in which an apparent pass interference penalty was not called.

Starting lineups

Officials
Referee: Terry McAulay (#77)
Umpire: Carl Paganelli (#124)
Head Linesman: Earnie Frantz (#111)
Line Judge: Byron Boston (#18)
Field Judge: Scott Steenson (#88)
Side Judge: Bill Spyksma (#12)
Back Judge: Billy Smith (#2)

See also
2001 Cleveland Browns season
2001 NFL season
2018 NFC Championship Game, which featured a controversial officiating decision later known as the "NOLA No-Call"
Fail Mary
List of -gate scandals and controversies
National Football League controversies

References 

2001 National Football League season
2001 in sports in Ohio
2000s in Cleveland
Cleveland Browns
Jacksonville Jaguars
National Football League games
National Football League controversies
December 2001 sports events in the United States